József Palotás (14 May 1911 – 16 November 1957) was a Hungarian wrestler who competed in the 1936 Summer Olympics.

References

1911 births
1957 deaths
Olympic wrestlers of Hungary
Wrestlers at the 1936 Summer Olympics
Hungarian male sport wrestlers
Olympic bronze medalists for Hungary
Olympic medalists in wrestling
Medalists at the 1936 Summer Olympics
20th-century Hungarian people